The 2019–20 EHF Champions League was the 60th edition of Europe's premier club handball tournament and the 27th edition under the current EHF Champions League format.

Because of the COVID-19 pandemic in Europe, the knockout stage matches were postponed and later cancelled. The Final Four, which took place at the Lanxess Arena in Cologne, Germany, was moved from May to December and was contested by the top two teams from Groups A and B – Barça, Paris Saint-Germain, THW Kiel and Telekom Veszprém. As a result, reigning champions Vardar were not able to defend their title.

Format
The competition begins with a group stage featuring twenty-eight teams divided in four groups: Groups A and B contain eight teams, while Groups C and D contain six teams. Matches are played in a double round-robin system with home-and-away fixtures. In Groups A and B, the top six teams qualify for the knockout stage, with teams ranked 2nd–6th entering the round of 16 and the group winners advancing directly to the quarter-finals. In Groups C and D, only the top two teams advance to a compete in a two-legged play-off round, with the two winners going through to the knockout stage round of 16.

The knockout stage includes four rounds: the round of 16, quarterfinals, and a final-four tournament comprising two semifinals and the final. In the round of 16, twelve teams (ten from Groups A and B, and the two play-off winners from Groups C and D) are paired against each other in two-legged home-and-away matches. The six aggregate winners of the round of 16 advance to the quarterfinals, joining the winners of Groups A and B. The eight quarterfinalist teams are paired against each other in two-legged home-and-away matches, with the four aggregate winners qualifying to the final-four tournament. 

In the final four tournament, the semifinals and the final are played as single matches at a pre-selected host venue.

Team allocation
A total of 35 teams from 21 countries submitted their application for a place in the competition's group stage before the deadline of 12 June. The final list of 28 participants was revealed by the EHF Executive Committee on 21 June.

Round and draw dates
The draw was held on 27 June 2019 in Vienna, Austria.

Group stage

The draw for the group stage was held on 27 June 2019 in Vienna, Austria. The teams were drawn into four groups, two containing eight teams (Groups A and B) and two containing six teams (Groups C and D). The only restriction was that teams from the same national association could not face each other in the same group.

In each group, teams played against each other in a double round-robin format, with home and away matches.

After completion of the group stage matches, the teams advancing to the knockout stage were determined in the following manner:

Groups A and B – the top team qualified directly for the quarterfinals, and the five teams ranked 2nd–6th advanced to the first knockout round.
Groups C and D – the top two teams from both groups contested a playoff to determine the last two sides joining the 10 teams from Groups A and B in the first knockout round.

Group A

Group B

Group C

Group D

Playoffs

Knockout stage

The winners of Groups A and B would have advanced directly to the quarterfinals, while the teams ranked 2nd–6th to the round of 16 alongside the playoff winners. After the cancellation of the last 16 and quarterfinals on 24 April 2020, the top-two placed teams from each group played the final four.

Round of 16

Quarterfinals

Final four

Final

Statistics and awards

Top goalscorers

Awards
The all-star team was announced on 12 June 2020.

Goalkeeper:  Niklas Landin
Right wing:  Niclas Ekberg
Right back:  Alex Dujshebaev
Centre back:  Mikkel Hansen
Left back:  Sander Sagosen
Left wing:  Manuel Štrlek
Pivot:  Bence Bánhidi

Other awards
Best Defender:  Blaž Blagotinšek
Best Young player:  Aleix Gómez
Best Coach:  David Davis

Notes

References

External links
Official website

 
2019
2019 in handball
2020 in handball
2019 in European sport
2020 in European sport
Handball events postponed due to the COVID-19 pandemic